The men's basketball team representing the University of Kentucky plays at the Division I level of the National Collegiate Athletics Association (NCAA) in the Southeastern Conference (SEC). The Kentucky Wildcats originally did not play within any athletic conference, before joining the Southern Intercollegiate Athletic Association in 1910. In 1921 they joined the newly established Southern Conference. Eleven years later they would join the SEC as a founding member. The Wildcats play their home games in Rupp Arena, named after their 16th head coach Adolph Rupp. They previously played in Memorial Coliseum, Alumni Gymnasium, Buell Armory Gymnasium, and began their existence playing in State College Gymnasium.

There have been 22 head coaches in the history of Kentucky basketball. The program has played over 3,100 games across 113 seasons from the program's inaugural 1903–04 season to the current year, 2022–23. Five Kentucky coaches, the most of any school, have led the team to a NCAA Men's Division I Basketball Championship: Rupp in 1948, 1949, 1951 and 1958; Joe B. Hall in 1978, Rick Pitino in 1996, Tubby Smith in 1998, and John Calipari in 2012. Kentucky also received two retroactive national championships for the 1932-33 and 1933–34 teams coached by Rupp given by the Premo-Porretta Power Poll and Helms Athletic Foundation respectively. Seven coaches have won a conference regular season championship by having the best overall regular season record with the Wildcats: Ray Eklund, Rupp, Hall, Eddie Sutton, Pitino, Smith and Calipari. Seven coaches have won a conference tournament with the Wildcats: George Buchheit, Rupp, Hall, Sutton, Pitino, Smith and Calipari. 

Rupp had the longest tenure at Kentucky, coaching for 42 seasons, and is the all-time leader in games coached (1,066) and wins at the school (874). Rupp's 874 wins were the most of any NCAA men's Division I coach at the time of his retirement in 1972. Eklund is the team's all-time leader in winning percentage, with a .833 winning percentage. Statistically, Basil Hayden has been the least successful coach of the Wildcats, with a winning percentage of .187. Five coaches have received national coaching awards while the head coach of Kentucky: Rupp, Sutton, Pitino, Smith, and Calipari. Rupp, Sutton, Pitino, and Calipari have all been inducted into the Basketball Hall of Fame. 

Kentucky's current head coach is John Calipari, who has held the position since 2009.

Statistics

Statistics are correct as of the 2021–22 college basketball season.

Coaching awards are only listed if won while the individual was the coach of Kentucky.

References

Kentucky

Kentucky Wildcats basketball, men's, coaches